Case 39 is a 2009 American supernatural horror film directed by Christian Alvart, and starring Renée Zellweger, Jodelle Ferland, Bradley Cooper and Ian McShane.

Plot
Emily Jenkins (Renée Zellweger) is a social worker living in Oregon who is assigned to investigate the family of Lillith Sullivan (Jodelle Ferland), a troubled ten-year-old whose school grades have declined due to an emotional rift with her parents, Edward and Margaret Sullivan (Callum Keith Rennie and Kerry O'Malley). Emily suspects that the parents have been abusing Lillith for her lack of obedience and begins to investigate the family further, questioning Lillith about her parents and planning a visit at the family's home. When Lillith is interviewed by Emily's boss and is too intimidated to answer his questions honestly, Emily visits Lillith at her school and gives the girl her home phone number, telling her to call if she is being hurt or needs help.

Her suspicion is later confirmed when Lillith calls Emily in the middle of the night, informing her that her parents are coming to kill her. With the help of Detective Mike Barron (Ian McShane), Emily intercepts and captures Edward and Margaret before they can incinerate Lillith by trapping her in their home oven and baking her alive.

Lillith is originally going to be sent to the children's home, but she begs Emily to look after her instead, and with the agreement of the board, Emily is assigned to take care of Lillith until a suitable foster family comes along. Two weeks after Lillith moves in with Emily, a boy named Diego (Alexander Conti), another one of Emily's cases, brutally murders his parents in the middle of the night, and Detective Barron informs Emily that somebody phoned Diego the night before the crime, and that the call originated from her home.

As she is suspected of involvement in the incident, Lillith undergoes a psychiatric evaluation by Emily's best friend, Douglas J. Ames (Bradley Cooper). However, during the session, Lillith asks Douglas what his fears are and begins to subtly threaten him by turning the questions around and beginning to evaluate him. Douglas conveys his discomfort to Emily and says that he will call a specialist in the morning to help with Lillith's evaluation. During the night Douglas receives a strange phone call at his home. A mass of hornets, which Douglas had previously told Lillith that he was afraid of, begin to fly out of his body, and he grows hysterical and kills himself.

After speaking to Diego and attending Douglas' funeral Emily becomes more suspicious of Lillith than her parents, and visits the asylum where Edward and Margaret are being kept under custody for their attempted murder of Lillith. Margaret is hysterical and unable to see visitors but Edward reveals to her that Lillith is far from human and is actually a succubus-like demon who feeds on emotion, and is capable of causing deadly hallucinations based on her victims' fears. Their attempt to kill her had been an attempt to save themselves and others, and that she is now feeding off of Emily's kindness and goodness and that Lillith will bleed her dry before moving on to her next victim.

Edward also informs Emily that the only way to kill Lillith is to get her to sleep, which she rarely does. Shortly after Emily leaves the asylum, Margaret hallucinates that she is on fire while inside a large oven, while Edward is stabbed in the eye after attacking a fellow inmate who spoke to him in the voice of Lillith. After Detective Barron receives a strange phone call in his home from Lillith he arms himself to help Emily. However, as he is on his way to Emily, Lillith makes him hallucinate that he is being attacked by dogs and he fatally shoots himself in the head with his shotgun.

After realizing that her closest colleagues have been eliminated and that the rest of her cases will be next, Emily serves Lillith tea spiked with a sedative pills and waits for her to fall asleep. While Lillith is asleep, Emily douses her home in gasoline and sets it ablaze, hoping to kill Lillith. However, Lillith, upon discovering Emily's plot, escapes unharmed.

A police officer offers to escort Emily and Lillith to a temporary place to sleep but as Emily is following the police cars, she suddenly takes a different route. She drives recklessly and at a high speed to scare Lillith but the girl forces Emily to relive her childhood memory of her mother-(who was killed in a car accident when Emily was a child) driving fast in a rainstorm and a truck overturning in their path. Emily fights the memory, telling herself that it is not real and the image fades, leaving Lillith herself confused that her illusions no longer scare Emily.

Emily crashes through a gate and drives the car off a pier into a lake. As the car sinks, Emily struggles to lock Lillith (now in full demon form) in the trunk by folding the rear seats back against her and drowning her. Emily exits the car and swims away but Lillith grabs her leg through a hole in the car's tail light section. Eventually Emily breaks free and Lillith lets go as the car continues to sink. Emily climbs back ashore and watches the water to assure she is really gone. The film ends with Emily smiling, relieved to finally be rid of Lillith.

Alternate ending
On the DVD as a deleted scene in the Special Features section, Emily careens through the harbor gate and drives the car off the pier into the bay just as in the theatrical ending. The car sinks to the bottom and fills with water. Suddenly, a man swims down to the car, opens Lillith's door, and carries her to the surface, leaving Emily behind. Emily tries unsuccessfully to open her door but begins to pass out. Then the man reappears and frees her too. As an ambulance carries Emily away, a news broadcast details the event, and Margaret Sullivan can be seen watching it. In the final scenes, Emily can be seen in handcuffs, frantically pleading with her lawyer to tell her where Lillith is. However, her lawyer refuses to answer, and instead orders for her to be shipped off to the asylum for schizophrenia. Meanwhile, Lillith arrives at the home of her new foster family.

Cast

Production
On October 31, 2006, a fire started on the film's set in Vancouver. None of the cast were on the set at the time and nobody was seriously injured, though the set and studio were destroyed. The film was shot in Vancouver in late 2006 and was released theatrically in the UK, other European, and in Latin American countries on August 13, 2009. The film was initially scheduled for U.S. release in August 2008, but was delayed twice before its final release date on October 1, 2010.

Reception

Box office
Case 39 was released to New Zealand cinemas on August 13, 2009 and in its opening weekend ranked #12, with NZ$35,056. It averaged a low NZ$1,845 at the 19 cinemas it was released. The film opened at a small wide release in Australia, being shown on 85 screens, and ranked #12 in its opening weekend, with a screen average of AU$2,077 and a gross of AU$176,526. Negative local reviews and its poor opening were followed by a 70% second weekend decrease. The film grossed a total of AU$332,956. It had a total of US$14,926,149 from its international run ahead of its U.S. release.

In its debut weekend in the United States, the film opened at #7, with an estimated US$5,350,000 in 2,211 theaters, averaging US$2,420 per cinema.

Critical response
Case 39 received mostly negative reviews from critics. On Rotten Tomatoes, the film holds a 21% approval rating based on 76 reviews, with an average rating of 4/10. The critics consensus states, "Director Christian Alvert has a certain stylish flair, but it's wasted on Case 39'''s frightless, unoriginal plot." On Metacritic, the film has a score of 25 out of 100, based on 15 critics, indicating "generally unfavorable reviews."

Gareth Jones of Dread Central gave the film 2 out of 5 "knives," saying, "I'm sure it will do decent business among the undemanding weekend-horror crowd and Zellweger fans when it eventually sees the light of day. Nobody else need apply." Margaret Pomeranz of the Australian version of At the Movies'' gave the film one out of 5 stars, calling it "one of the least scary, dumbest movies I've seen in a long time." Her co-host David Stratton gave it 1½ out of 5, commenting that "once it sort of kicks into the plot – once it really gets down to the nitty gritty, like so many horror films it just becomes really ridiculous and silly."

See also
 List of ghost films

References

External links
 
 
 
 
 
 Case 39 full production notes

2009 films
2009 horror films
2000s horror thriller films
2000s mystery films
2000s psychological horror films
2009 psychological thriller films
American horror thriller films
American mystery films
American psychological horror films
American psychological thriller films
Canadian horror thriller films
Canadian mystery films
Demons in film
English-language Canadian films
Films about dysfunctional families
Films directed by Christian Alvart
Films produced by Steve Golin
Films set in Oregon
Films shot in Portland, Oregon
Films shot in Vancouver
Paramount Pictures films
Paramount Vantage films
Succubi in film
2000s supernatural horror films
2000s English-language films
2000s American films
2000s Canadian films